Factor H is a member of the regulators of complement activation family and is a complement control protein.  It is a large (155 kilodaltons), soluble glycoprotein that circulates in human plasma (at typical concentrations of 200–300 micrograms per milliliter). Its principal function is to regulate the alternative pathway of the complement system, ensuring that the complement system is directed towards pathogens or other dangerous material and does not damage host tissue. Factor H regulates complement activation on self cells and surfaces by possessing both cofactor activity for the Factor I mediated C3b cleavage, and decay accelerating activity against the alternative pathway C3-convertase, C3bBb. Factor H exerts its protective action on self cells and self surfaces but not on the surfaces of bacteria or viruses.  This is thought to be the result of Factor H having the ability to adopt conformations with lower or higher activities as a cofactor for C3 cleavage or decay accelerating activity.  The lower activity conformation is the predominant form in solution and is sufficient to control fluid phase amplification. The more active conformation is thought to be induced when Factor H binds to glycosaminoglycans (GAGs) and or sialic acids that are generally present on host cells but not, normally, on pathogen surfaces ensuring that self surfaces are protected whilst complement proceeds unabated on foreign surfaces.

Structure 

The molecule is made up of 20 complement control protein (CCP) modules (also referred to as Short Consensus Repeats or sushi domains) connected to one another by short linkers (of between three and eight amino acid residues) and arranged in an extended head to tail fashion.  Each of the CCP modules consists of around 60 amino acids with four cysteine residues disulfide bonded in a 1–3 2-4 arrangement, and a hydrophobic core built around an almost invariant tryptophan residue.  The CCP modules are numbered from 1–20 (from the N-terminus of the protein); CCPs 1–4 and CCPs 19–20 engage with C3b while CCPs 7 and CCPs 19–20 bind to GAGs and sialic acid. To date atomic structures have been determined for CCPs 1–3, CCP 5, CCP 7, CCPs 10–11 and CCPs 11–12, CCPs 12–13, CCP 15, CCP 16, CCPs 15–16, CCPs 18–20, and CCPs 19–20.  The atomic structure for CCPs 6–8 bound to the GAG mimic sucrose octasulfate, CCPs 1–4 in complex with C3b and CCPs 19–20 in complex with C3d (that corresponds to the thioester domain of C3b) have also been determined.  Although an atomic resolution structure for intact factor H has not yet been determined, low resolution techniques indicate that it may be bent back in solution.  Information available to date indicates that CCP modules 1–4 is responsible for the cofactor and decay acceleration activities of factor H, whereas self/non-self discrimination occurs predominantly through GAG binding to CCP modules 7 and/or GAG or sialic acid binding to 19–20.

Clinical significance 
Due to the central role that factor H plays in the regulation of complement, there are a number of clinical implications arising from aberrant factor H activity. Overactive factor H may result in reduced complement activity on pathogenic cells - increasing susceptibility to microbial infections. Underactive factor H may result in increased complement activity on healthy host cells - resulting in autoimmune diseases. It is not surprising, therefore, that rare mutations or common single nucleotide polymorphisms (SNPs) in the complement factor H gene (CFH) often result in pathologies. Moreover, the complement inhibitory activities of factor H, and other complement regulators, are often used by pathogens to increase virulence.

Age-related macular degeneration 

In 2005, several independent research groups identified an SNP in CFH, which results in the protein change p.Y402H, as a risk factor for AMD present in around a third of Europeans. Although its allele frequency varies considerably between different populations, Y402H has been consistently associated with AMD onset and progression.Homozygous individuals have an approximately seven-fold greater odds of association with AMD while heterozygotes have a two-to-three-fold greater odds of association with the disease. This SNP, located in CCP module 7 of factor H, has been shown to affect the ability of factor H protein to localise to sites of inflammation in retinal tissues (e.g. by polyanions and pentraxins) and to regulate the activation of complement and immune cells. The SNP has also been shown to affect the function of factor H-like protein 1, an alternatively spliced version of factor H consisting of CCPs 1 to 7 only, which is thought to have a greater role in intraocular complement regulation. However, the genetic variants in CFH with the greatest effect on an individual's risk of AMD have been shown to affect CCPs 1 to 4, which are involved in dampening the effects of the alternative pathway of complement. A rare functional coding change, p.R1210C, in CFH results in a functional deficiency in factor H and leads to a substantially higher risk of macular degeneration as well as complement-mediated renal conditions.

Variation in other genes of the regulators of complement activation locus, such as complement factor H-related genes, as well as in other complement proteins (e.g. factor I, C2/factor B, and C3) have also been associated with greater AMD risk. The current theory is that complement dysregulation is a key driver of chronic inflammation in AMD.

Atypical hemolytic uremic syndrome 
Hemolytic uremic syndrome (HUS) is a disease associated with microangiopathic hemolytic anemia, thrombocytopenia, and acute renal failure. It can be either acquired (e.g. following infection with shigatoxigenic Escherichia coli), or inherited (also known as atypical hemolytic uremic syndrome, aHUS). aHUS has been strongly linked to mutations in genes of the complement system, especially factor H. In contrast to AMD and C3 glomerulopathy (another complement-mediated renal disorder) which are mainly associated with variation in the N-terminus (CCPs 1 to 4), predisposing mutations in factor H mainly affect the C-terminus of the protein (CCP modules 19 and 20), which has been shown to be responsible for adherence to renal tissues and the regulation of complement components and their downstream effectors.

Schizophrenia 
Alterations in the immune response are involved in pathogenesis of many neuropsychiatric disorders including schizophrenia. Recent studies indicated alterations in the complement system, including those which may result in the overactivation of the alternative complement pathway, may predispose to schizophrenia. For example, the CFH SNP rs424535 (2783-526T>A) was positively associated with schizophrenia.

Ischemic stroke 
It was found that rs800292(184G >A) SNP was positively associated with stroke and rs800912 minor allele of the CFH gene might be considered as a risk factor for ischemic stroke.

Recruitment by pathogens 
Given the central role of factor H in protecting cells from complement, it is not surprising that several important human pathogens have evolved mechanisms for recruiting factor H. This recruitment of factor H by pathogens provides significant resistance to complement attack, and therefore increased virulence. Pathogens that have been shown to recruit factor H include: Aspergillus spp.; Borrelia burgdorferi; B. duttonii; B. recurrentis; Candida albicans; Francisella tularensis; Haemophilus influenzae; Neisseria meningitidis; Streptococcus pneumoniae; and Streptococcus pyogenes.
The Gram-negative bacterium B.burgdorferi has five Factor H binding proteins: CRASP-1, CRASP-2, CRASP-3, CRASP-4 and CRASP-5. Each CRASP protein also binds plasminogen. It is possible that the allele frequency of CFH variants across the globe reflects selective pressure from infectious diseases.

Interactions 
Factor H has been shown to interact with complement component 3, amongst other complement proteins and factors, leading to regulation of the alternative pathway of complement in particular.

Recombinant production
Biologically active Factor H has been produced by Ralf Reski and coworkers in the moss bioreactor, in a process called molecular farming. Large quantities of biologically active human Factor H, potentially suitable for therapeutic purposes, were produced using a synthetic codon-optimised gene expressed in the yeast expression host, Pichia pastoris.

Potential use as a Therapeutic Drug

Age Related Macular Degeneration 
Gemini Therapeutics Inc. is a Massachusetts based precision medicine company focused on the development of new therapies through a deeper understanding of disease. Based on the biological activity of human factor H, Gemini is developing a recombinant human factor H protein, GEM103, for the treatment of dry AMD.  Gemini recently announced the completion of enrollment in a Phase 2a Trial of GEM103 in Dry Age-Related Macular Degeneration (AMD) in Patients with High-Risk Genetic Variants.  Top line data are expected in 1H 2021.

References

Further reading

External links 
  GeneReviews/NCBI/NIH/UW entry on Atypical Hemolytic-Uremic Syndrome
  GeneReviews/NCBI/NIH/UW entry on Dense Deposit Disease/Membranoproliferative Glomerulonephritis Type II
 OMIM entries on Atypical Hemolytic-Uremic Syndrome
 

Complement system